The Great Lavra Bell Tower or the Great Belfry is the main bell tower of the ancient cave monastery of Kyiv Pechersk Lavra in Kyiv, the capital of Ukraine. It is one of the most notable buildings of the Kyiv skyline (see picture).

The bell tower was the highest free-standing bell tower at the time of its construction in 1731–1745. It was designed by the architect Johann Gottfried Schädel. Its total height, with the Christian cross, is 96.5 metres (316 feet).

The Great Lavra Bell Tower is a Neoclassical architecture construction with a total of four tiers, surmounted by a gilded dome. The diameter of the tower's lowest tier at its base is 28.8 metres (94 feet), and the thickness of the first tier walls is 8 metres (26 feet). The tower's foundation exceeds 7 metres (22 feet). The tower is decorated with many architectural columns: the second tier is decorated with 32 Dorian columns, the third tier is decorated with 16 Ionic columns, and the fourth with 8 Corinthian columns.

On the third tier, there were some hanging bells, but they were later removed. To this day, only three small 18th-century bells have been preserved: the Balyk,joe, and Bezymiannyi bells. The former main bell of the Great Lavra Bell Tower, the Uspenskyi'', had a total weight of one ton and was cast in 1732 by Ivan Motorin, who was also responsible for the Moscow Kremlin Tsar Bell. There is also a viewing platform atop the third tier, which provides visitors with a bird's-eye view of the region around Kyiv.

On the fourth tier there is a chiming clock, manufactured in 1903, which has a total weight of 4.5 tons. The current bell tower's clock, designed by the Moscow master A. Enodin and based on the Kremlin clock, replaced the older 18th-century clock of the master A. Levynskyi. The clock has stopped only once during its existence: it happened in September 1941 when the Dormition Cathedral of the Pechersk Lavra was blown up by army forces during the Second World War.

The clock was repaired following the destruction of the nearby cathedral, which took a total of six years to complete. Since that time, the clock has never needed any repairs. The clock's mechanism is very accurate; up to within 10 seconds. However, it has been observed that its accuracy depends on the time of the year: in the Winter, the clock works somewhat slower than in the Summertime. The clock's mechanism has to be rewound once a week, and the clock's bells chime every quarter of the hour.

Gallery

See also 
 List of tallest Orthodox churches
 Assumption Cathedral, Kharkiv - the second tallest bell tower in Ukraine

Footnotes

References
 
 

Christian bell towers
Religious buildings and structures in Kyiv
Bell towers in Ukraine
Kyiv Pechersk Lavra
Pecherskyi District
Towers completed in 1745
Neoclassical architecture in Kyiv
Neoclassical church buildings in Ukraine